Richard Yeabsley (born 2 November 1973) is an English former first-class cricketer.

Son of former Devon player Doug Yeabsley, and brother of fellow first-class player Michael, Richard was educated at Haberdashers' Aske's Boys' School and Keble College, Oxford. He was a sharp medium-pace bowler and useful batsman. During his brief career, he represented Oxford University and Middlesex, playing a total of 19 first-class matches and making five List A appearances. Yeabsley quit the game, aged just 22, with a career first-class bowling average of 32.77.

His best bowling performance came in the 1994 Varsity match. He took 6–54 in the first innings, and 4–50 in the second, giving him his only five wicket innings and ten wicket match hauls.

Like his father Doug, Richard Yeabsley played top-class cricket and rugby union. In the latter, he appeared three times for London Irish.

In 2011 Yeabsley was head of foreign exchange (FX) options at BGC Partners branch in London.

References

External sources

1973 births
Living people
Alumni of Keble College, Oxford
Cricketers from St Albans
Devon cricketers
English cricketers
London Irish players
Middlesex cricketers
Oxford University cricketers
People educated at Haberdashers' Boys' School